The 1989 Challenge Cup was the 88th staging of rugby league's oldest knockout competition, the Challenge Cup. Known as the Silk Cut Challenge Cup for sponsorship reasons, the final was contested by Wigan and St. Helens at Wembley. Wigan won the match 27–0.

Preliminary round

First round

Second round

Quarter-finals

Semi finals

Final
This was the first time since 1951 that a team had been held scoreless in a Challenge Cup Final at Wembley.

References

External links
Challenge Cup official website 
Challenge Cup 1988/89 results at Rugby League Project

Challenge Cup
Challenge Cup